Human Universe is a British television series broadcast on BBC Two, presented by Professor Brian Cox. An accompanying book was also published.

Episodes

1. "Apeman – Spaceman"
First broadcast: 9:00 pm, 7 Oct 2014 on BBC Two

Brian charts our story from apes to the birth of civilization and ultimately to the stars.

Beginning in Ethiopia, Professor Brian Cox discovers how the universe played a key role in our ascent from apeman to spaceman by driving the expansion of our brains. But big brains alone did not get us to space. To reveal what did, Brian heads out of Africa, to the ancient city of Petra in Jordan, where he unpicks the next part of our story – the birth of civilization – and then on to Kazakhstan, where he witnesses the return of astronauts from space and explains what took us from civilization to the stars.

2. "Why Are We Here?"
First broadcast: 9:00 pm, 14 Oct 2014 on BBC Two

Brian Cox tackles the question that unites the 7 billion people on Earth: Why are we here?

Brian reveals how the wonderful complexity of nature and human life is simply the consequence of chance events constrained by the laws of physics that govern our universe. But this leads him to a deeper question – why does our universe seem to have been set up with just the right rules to create us? In a dizzying conclusion Brian unpacks this question, revealing the very latest understanding of how the universe came to be this way, and in doing so offers a radical new answer to why we are here.

3. "Are We Alone?"
First broadcast: 9:00 pm, 21 Oct 2014 on BBC Two

Brian Cox explores mankind's place in the universe. He considers the possibility of alien life – could it exist and will humans ever find it?

Brian discusses the Wow! signal, Drake equation and explains the ingredients needed for an intelligent civilization to evolve in the universe – the need for a benign star, for a habitable planet, for life to spontaneously arise on such a planet and the time required for intelligent life to evolve and build a civilization. Brian weighs the evidence and arrives at his own provocative answer to the puzzle of our apparent solitude. He argues that the difficulty inherent in the development of eukaryotic cells represents such a barrier to the emergence of intelligent life that Earth may be the only planet where this has taken place in the Milky Way galaxy. In this episode Brian also tells us how Kepler observes into deep space seeking other solar systems just like our very own – How many potential 'earth-like' planets are there in the galaxy?

4. "A Place in Space and Time"
First broadcast: 9:00 pm, 28 October 2014 on BBC Two

Professor Brian Cox explores our origins, place and destiny in the universe. He describes the initial conditions of the human psyche as one that places itself at the center of the universe, surrounded by family, environment, and events. Brian tells the story of how our innate human curiosity has led us from feeling that we are at the center of everything, to our modern understanding of our true place in space and time – that we are living 13.8 billion years from the beginning of the universe, on a mere speck of rock in a possibly infinite expanse of space.

The story begins with Brian climbing to the summit of the fortified village of Ait-Ben-Haddou in the foothills of Morocco's Atlas Mountains. Here he demonstrates how the stars' motion across the night sky appears to make our central position self-evident.

Thanks to the artisan glass-blowers of Renaissance Venice, Galileo was able to build the first telescope and discover our orbital position around the sun—relegating us to just one among a number of planets and effecting our demotion from the center of the universe.

5. "What is Our Future?"
First broadcast: 9:00 pm, 4 Nov 2014 on BBC Two

In the final episode of the series, Professor Brian Cox explores the future of our home planet, its unfolding relationship with the rest of the universe, and its effect on our destiny as a species.

Production
Human Universe was commissioned by Janice Hadlow for BBC Two and Kim Shillinglaw, head commissioner for science and natural history. The series consists of five sixty-minute episodes.

International broadcast
 – This programme premiered on ABC on 7 January 2015, under the title Human Universe with Brian Cox.
 Flanders – International version of this programme (Brian Cox replaced by different local presenters) premiered on the VRT, which reaches the Flemish inhabitants of Belgium, on 3 June 2015, under the title Human Universe.
 – This programme premiered on TVB Pearl on 24 June 2015.
 – This programme premiered on Science Channel on 10 June 2015, under the title Hacking the Universe.

Merchandise
DVD releases of the series are set to be released on 10 November 2014. A book, written by Brian Cox and Andrew Cohen, accompanying the series was released on 9 October 2014, with a Kindle e-book version also made available on 31 October 2014.

See also
 Wonders of the Universe
 Wonders of the Solar System
 Wonders of Life
 Forces of Nature

References

External links
 
 
 

2014 British television series debuts
2014 British television series endings
BBC television documentaries
BBC high definition shows
English-language television shows